Senator Hinkle may refer to:

Greg Hinkle (born 1946), Montana State Senate
James F. Hinkle (1862–1951), New Mexico State Senate
Jedediah Hinkle (fl. 2010s), Montana State Senate